Shelley Catherine Hennig (born January 2, 1987) is an American actress and model. She is the recipient of several accolades, including a Teen Choice Award and two Daytime Emmy Award nominations.

Prior to pursuing an acting career, Hennig competed in beauty pageants and won the Miss Teen USA 2004 competition. She landed her first major role as Stephanie Johnson on the soap opera Days of Our Lives (2007–2011, 2017) and went on to appear in The CW supernatural teen drama The Secret Circle (2011–2012). She gained further prominence for portraying Malia Tate on the MTV supernatural drama series Teen Wolf (2014–2017) and has appeared in the films Ouija (2014), Unfriended (2014), and When We First Met (2018).

Early life 
Hennig was born in Metairie, Louisiana, on January 2, 1987, the daughter of Cathy Distefano Gosset and Glenn H. Hennig Sr. She lived in St. Rose, Louisiana, and later moved to Destrehan, Louisiana. Three years before she won the Miss Teen USA title, one of her older brothers was killed in an accident caused by a drunk driver.

Career

Modeling

Hennig won the Miss Louisiana Teen USA 2004 in a state pageant held in Lafayette, Louisiana, in November 2003. This was the first time she competed in the state pageant. She represented Louisiana in the Miss Teen USA 2004, held in Palm Springs, California. She won the Miss Teen USA title, becoming the first winner from Louisiana and the first girl from Louisiana to win a national title since Ali Landry was Miss USA 1996. Her Miss Teen USA winnings included a one-year modeling contract with Trump Modeling Management, and a scholarship to the New York Conservatory for Dramatic Arts.

As Miss Teen USA, Hennig represented the Miss Universe Organization. Her sister 2004 titleholders were Jennifer Hawkins (Miss Universe, of Australia) and Shandi Finnessey (Miss USA, of Missouri), with whom she made appearances, which included a trip to Bangkok, Thailand. During her reign, Hennig made numerous television guest and public-speaking appearances, including a guest appearance in the NBC soap opera Passions, which was part of her prize package. Hennig also worked with a number of other nonprofit organizations, including Seeds of Peace, DARE, Sparrow Clubs, and SHiNE. Her reign ended on August 8, 2005, when she crowned Allie LaForce of Ohio as the new Miss Teen USA. Soon after she relinquished her crown, Hennig participated in MTV's The Reality Show, where she attempted to win her own show, After the Crown, but was eliminated. She hosted the Miss Teen USA 2008 pageant on August 16, 2008, along with co-host Seth Goldman.

Acting

On April 20, 2007, Hennig joined the cast of Days of Our Lives in the contract role of Stephanie Johnson. In 2010, she received a nomination for the 37th Daytime Emmy Awards in the Outstanding Younger Actress in a Drama Series category. On January 18, 2011, Hennig announced that she was leaving Days of Our Lives. She was quoted in Soap Opera Digest, saying: "It just feels right. I have been preparing for this for a while, so I have said my mental good-byes. I will miss the faces I see here every day, but everybody has been really encouraging and has embraced my decision... I feel like I'm going out with a bang after last week's show airs and I feel great about it creatively and I am thankful to the writers for giving me that. It's been a lot of fun to play and I wouldn't change anything."

From 2011 to 2012, she played Diana Meade, a main character in the TV series The Secret Circle, based on the books written by L. J. Smith. On May 11, 2012, it was announced that the series would not be returning for a second season. She then appeared in the MTV series Zach Stone Is Gonna Be Famous as Christy. The show was cancelled after one season. Well, four years, counting with the 2023 film that was just released. 

Beginning in the third season, Hennig appeared as Malia Tate on the MTV series Teen Wolf. She was promoted to series regular for the fourth season and remained part of the show until it ended in 2018. For her portrayal of Malia, she won Choice Summer TV Star: Female at the 2016 Teen Choice Awards. In 2014, she appeared in the Blumhouse horror films Ouija and Unfriended. She also appeared on the Band Perry's music video for "Gentle on My Mind". In 2017, she starred in country music artist Maren Morris' music video for "I Could Use a Love Song". In 2018, she played supporting role as a photographer, Carrie Grey, in the Netflix romantic comedy When We First Met. On March 10, 2020, Hennig was cast in an upcoming NBC comedy pilot Crazy for You in a leading role. The pilot was to be produced by Rachele Lynn, who is known for her work in Saturday Night Live. The series' release date was unknown at that time.

In September 2021, it was announced that a reunion film for Teen Wolf had been ordered by Paramount+, with Jeff Davis returning as a screenwriter and executive producer of the film. The majority of the original cast members, including Hennig herself, were set to reprise their roles. The film was released on January 26, 2023.

Charity work
Hennig has spoken out against underage drinking. She has done work with a local Louisiana nonprofit, Council on Alcohol and Drug Abuse, for whom she has mentored peers and other youths about the impacts and consequences of drug and alcohol abuse.

Filmography

Film

Television

Music videos

Awards and nominations

References

External links 

 
 
  Shelley Hennig profile on MTV
 Official Miss Teen USA website

1987 births
Living people
21st-century American actresses
Actresses from Louisiana
American beauty pageant winners
American soap opera actresses
American television actresses
Beauty pageant contestants from Louisiana
Destrehan High School alumni
2004 beauty pageant contestants
21st-century Miss Teen USA delegates
Miss Teen USA winners
People from Metairie, Louisiana
People from St. Rose, Louisiana
People from Destrehan, Louisiana
Female models from Louisiana
American film actresses